Princess Sirindhorn Stadium  is a sports stadium in Si Racha, Chonburi Province, Thailand. The name of the stadium come from the name of Princess Sirindhorn, Princess Royal of Thailand. It is currently used mostly for football matches and is the formerly home stadium of Sriracha FC and formerly of Chonburi FC.  The stadium holds 8,000 people. The Stadium is located near the city centre, on the ground of the Assumption College Sriracha. The stadium has a running track, as do most of the stadiums in Thailand. It is fitted with floodlights, enabling evening matches to be played.

References

Chonburi F.C.
Football venues in Thailand
Sport in Chonburi province
Buildings and structures in Chonburi province